The Double Agent is a 1966 spy thriller novel by the British writer John Bingham. It features the fictional head of British intelligence Ducane, who recurs in several of the author's novels. It was a runner-up for the Gold Dagger award.

References

Bibliography
 Reilly, John M. Twentieth Century Crime & Mystery Writers. Springer, 2015.
 West, Nigel. The A to Z of British Intelligence. Scarecrow Press, 2009.

1966 British novels
British thriller novels
Novels by John Bingham
British spy novels
Victor Gollancz Ltd books